Heinrich Hoffmann (12 September 188515 December 1957) was Adolf Hitler's official photographer, and a Nazi politician and publisher, who was a member of Hitler's intimate circle. Hoffmann's photographs were a significant part of Hitler's propaganda campaign to present himself and the Nazi Party as a significant mass phenomenon. He received royalties from all uses of Hitler's image, even on postage stamps, which made him a millionaire over the course of Hitler's rule. After the Second World War he was tried and sentenced to four years in prison for war profiteering. He was classified by the Allies' Art Looting Investigators to be a "major offender" in Nazi art plundering of Jews, as both art dealer and collector and his art collection, which contained many artworks looted from Jews, was ordered confiscated by the Allies. In 1956, the Bavarian State ordered all art under its control and formerly possessed by Hoffmann to be returned to him.

Life and career
After completing his primary school education, Hoffmann trained as a photographer from 1901 to 1903. Until 1909, he found employment in Heidelberg,  Frankfurt am Main, Bad Homburg, Switzerland, France and England. By 1909, he owned a photographic shop in Munich and started to work as a press photographer. In 1913, he founded the image agency Photobericht Hoffmann. In 1917, Hoffmann was conscripted into the German Army and served in France as a photo correspondent with the Bavarian Fliegerersatz-Abteilung I. In 1919, he joined the Bavarian Einwohnerwehren, a right-wing citizens' militia. That year he witnessed the short-lived post-war Bavarian Soviet Republic  in Munich, and published a collection of photographs he had taken as Ein Jahr Bayrische Revolution im Bilde ("One Year of Bavarian Revolution in Pictures"). The accompanying text, by Emil Herold, suggested a connection between the "Jewish features" shown in the photographs and the subjects' left-wing policies.

Odeonsplatz picture

A noted photograph, taken by Hoffmann in Munich's Odeonsplatz on 2 August 1914, apparently shows a young Hitler among the crowd cheering the outbreak of World War I. The photo was later used in Nazi propaganda, although its authenticity has been questioned.

Hoffmann claimed that he only discovered Hitler in the photograph in 1929, after the Nazi leader had visited the photographer's studio.  Learning that Hoffmann had photographed the crowd in the Odeonsplatz, Hitler told Hoffmann that he had been there, and Hoffmann said he then searched the glass negative of the image until he found Hitler. The photograph was published in the 12 March 1932 issue of the Illustrierter Beobachter ("Illustrated Observer"), a Nazi newspaper.  After the war, the glass negative could not be found. Footage of the event from a similar angle has also been claimed to show Hitler, but there is no evidence he adopted a toothbrush moustache before the war.

In 2010, historian , a German expert on the First World War, came to the conclusion that Hoffmann had doctored the image. Krumeich examined other images of the rally and was unable to find Hitler in the place where Hoffmann's photograph placed him. Also, in a different version of Hoffmann's photo in the Bavarian State Archive, Hitler looks like a different man than in the published image. As a result of the doubt raised by those considerations, the curators of a 2010 Berlin exhibition about Hitler's influence inserted a notice saying that the image's authenticity could not be vouched for.

Nazi Party
Hoffmann met Hitler in 1919 and joined the Nazi Party on 6 April 1920. He participated in the Beer Hall Putsch as a photographic correspondent. While the Nazi Party was banned in 1923, Hoffmann joined the ephemeral Großdeutsche Volksgemeinschaft then rejoined the Nazi Party in 1925. The following year he co-founded the Illustrierter Beobachter. In November 1929, he represented the Nazi Party in the district assembly of Upper Bavaria and, from December 1929 to December 1933, he served as a city councillor of Munich. In 1940, Hoffmann became a member of the Nazi German Reichstag.

After Hitler had taken control of the party in 1921, he named Hoffmann his official photographer, a post he held for over a quarter-century.  No other photographer but Hoffmann was allowed to take pictures of Hitler. Hoffmann himself was forbidden to take candid shots. Once, at the Berghof, Hitler's mountain retreat, Hoffmann took a picture of Hitler playing with his mistress Eva Braun's terrier. Hitler told Hoffmann that he could not publish the picture, because "a statesman does not permit himself to be photographed with a little dog. A German sheepdog is the only dog worthy of a real man". Hitler strictly controlled his public image in all respects, having himself photographed in any new suit before he would wear it in public, according to Hoffmann, and ordering in 1933 that all images of himself wearing lederhosen be withdrawn from circulation. He also expressed his disapproval of Benito Mussolini allowing himself to be photographed in his bathing suit.

The attempt by Hoffmann to portray Hitler as the epitome of the German people was difficult because Hitler lacked the racial profile of the Nordic race (i.e. tall with blonde hair), which the Nazi New Order sought to preserve. Hoffmann tried to portray Hitler in the best light by focusing more on his eyes, which many found dreamy and hypnotic.

Hoffmann's photographs were a significant part of Hitler's propaganda campaign to present himself and the Nazi Party as a significant mass phenomenon. In 1926, Hoffmann's images of the Party's rally in Weimar in Thuringia – one of the few German states in which Hitler was not banned from speaking at the time – showed the impressive march-past of 5,000 stormtroopers, saluted by Hitler for the first time with the straight-armed "Roman" or Fascist salute.  Those pictures were printed in the main Nazi newspaper, the  Völkischer Beobachter,  and distributed by the thousands throughout Germany.  That rally was the progenitor of the Party's annual mass rallies, which were staged quasi-annually in Nuremberg.  Later, Hoffmann's book, The Hitler Nobody Knows (1933) was an important part of Hitler's strenuous effort to manipulate and control his public image.

Hitler and Hoffmann became close friends. Historian Alan Bullock succinctly described Hoffmann as an "earthy Bavarian with a weakness for drinking parties and hearty jokes", who "enjoyed the licence of a court jester" with Hitler. Hoffmann was part of the small party which drove to Landsberg Prison to meet Hitler when he was released from prison on parole on 20 December 1924, and he took Hitler's picture. Later, Hoffmann often dined with Hitler at the Berghof or at the Führer's favorite restaurant in Munich, the Osteria Bavaria, gossiping with him and sharing stories about the painters from Schwabing that Hoffmann knew. He accompanied Hitler on his unprecedented election campaign by air during the presidential election against Field Marshal Paul von Hindenburg in 1932.

In the autumn of 1929, Hoffmann and his second wife Erna introduced his Munich studio assistant, Eva Braun, to Hitler. According to Hoffmann, Hitler thought she was "an attractive little thing" – Hitler preferred women to be seen and not heard – but Braun actively pursued him, telling her friends that Hitler was in love with her and claiming she would get him to marry her. Hoffmann reported, however, that even though Braun eventually became a resident of the Berghof – after the death of Geli Raubal (see below) – and was then constantly at Hitler's side during the times he was with his private entourage, she was not immediately his mistress. He believed that did happen at some point, even though Hitler's outward attitude to her never changed. Ultimately, to the surprise of his intimate circle, Hitler married Braun in the Führerbunker in Berlin on 29 April 1945, and the couple committed suicide together the following day.

On 17 September 1931, Hitler was with Hoffmann on a trip from Munich to Hamburg when the Führer got word that his niece, Geli Raubal – whom he adored and who accompanied him to almost all social events – had committed suicide by shooting herself. In his post-war memoir, Hitler Was My Friend, Hoffmann expressed the opinion that Raubal killed herself because she was in love with someone other than Hitler, and could not take Hitler's rabidly jealous control of her life, especially after he found out that she had had an affair with Emil Maurice, Hitler's old comrade and chauffeur.

Serving Hitler's regime
When Hitler became the ruler of Germany, Hoffmann was the only person authorized to take official photographs of him. Hoffmann's photographs were published as postage stamps, postcards, posters and picture books. Following Hoffmann's suggestion, both he and Hitler received royalties from all uses of Hitler's image, even on postage stamps, which made both Hitler and Hoffmann millionaires. The postage-stamp royalty amounted to at least $75 million over the course of Hitler's reign. When photographing other subjects, he was represented by Schostal Photo Agency (Agentur Schostal).

In 1933, Hoffmann was elected to the Reichstag which, after the passage of the Enabling Act of 1933, had become a powerless entity with little function except to serve as a stage setting for some of Hitler's policy speeches. As a one-party state, an "election" in Nazi Germany meant marking a ballot approving the Führer's list of candidates; no alternative choices were presented or allowed.

The personal esteem Hitler held for Hoffmann is indicated by the fact that, in 1935, he allowed the photographer to issue a limited edition of a portfolio of seven paintings Hitler had made during World War I, even though since becoming Chancellor he had downplayed his desire to become a painter in his youth. In later years, Hitler forbade any publication of or commentary about his work as a painter. Also in 1935, for Hoffmann's 50th birthday, Hitler gave the photographer one of his own paintings of the courtyard of the Alte Residenz ("Old Royal Palace") in Munich, a favorite subject of Hitler's, and one he had painted many times when he was a struggling artist. Hoffmann came to own at least four of Hitler's watercolors. One was purchased in 1944, which provoked Hitler to remark that it would have been "insane" to have paid more than 150 or 200 marks for it, at most. The pictures were seized by the U.S. Army at the end of the war, and were never returned to Germany.

In 1937, after the selection jury had outraged and angered Hitler with their choices for the first Great German Art Exhibition to inaugurate the opening of the House of German Art in Munich, he dismissed the panel and put Hoffmann in charge.  That dismayed the artistic community, who felt that Hoffmann was unqualified for the role. Frederic Spotts, in Hitler and the Aesthetics of Power, reports that Hoffmann was "an alcoholic and cretin who knew little more about painting than did the average plumber". Hoffmann's answer to his critics was that he knew what Hitler wanted and what would appeal to him. Nevertheless, even some of Hoffmann's choices were dismissed from the exhibition by Hitler. A room full of somewhat more modern paintings which Hoffmann had selected as possibilities were angrily dismissed by Hitler with a gesture. Hoffmann remained in charge for subsequent annual Great German Art Exhibitions, making the preliminary selections which were then hung for Hitler to approve or veto.  Hoffmann preferred the conventional work of painters from southern Germany, what Propaganda Minister Joseph Goebbels called in his diary "Munich-school kitsch", over that of the more experimental painters from the north.

In May 1938, when Hitler decreed the "Law for the Confiscation of the Products of Degenerate Art" – which retroactively justified the Nazis' confiscation, without payment, of modern art from museums and galleries for the exhibition of "Degenerate Art" mounted in Munich in July 1937, and allowed for the further unpaid removal of such art from institutions and individuals – Hoffmann was one of the commissioners named to centralize the condemnation and confiscation process, along with chairman Adolf Ziegler, President of the Reich Chamber for Visual Arts, the art deal Karl Haberstock, and others.  A year later, Josef Goebbels, the Reich Propaganda Minister, brought the commission into his Ministry and restaffed it to include more art dealers, since the sale of the confiscated works internationally was a source of hard currency for the Nazi regime – although not as much as was expected, since the knowledge that the Nazis were putting large numbers of the artworks up for sale depressed their market value. When auctions were halted as war approached, there were still over 12,000 works stored in warehouses which the commission Hoffmann sat on had condemned as artistically worthless. Hitler personally inspected these, and refused to allow them to be returned to the collections from which they had been confiscated. The result was the burning of 1,004 oil paintings and 3,825 other works in the courtyard of Berlin's central fire station, on 20 March 1939.

Along with sculptor Arno Breker, stage designer Benno von Arent, architect Gerdy Troost, and  museum director Hans Posse, Hoffmann was one of the few people whose artistic judgment Hitler trusted. He bestowed the honorific title of "Professor" on Hoffmann in 1938, something he did for many of his favorites in the arts, such as Leni Riefenstahl, the actress and film director, architects Albert Speer and Hermann Giesler, sculptors Breker and Josef Thorak, Wilhelm Furtwängler, conductor of the Berlin Philharmonic, and actor Emil Jannings, among others.

Hoffmann accompanied Hitler on his state visit to Italy in 1938, in which the Führer was much taken by the beauty of the Italian cities of Rome, Naples and Florence and the artworks and architecture they contained. Hoffmann (with von Ribbentrop's photographer Helmut Laux) were in the party that went to the Soviet Union when Foreign Minister Joachim von Ribbentrop secretly negotiated the Non-Aggression Treaty with Vyacheslav Molotov in 1939, which enabled Hitler to invade Poland. Hitler specifically asked Hoffmann to take a close-up photograph of Stalin's earlobes, by which he thought he could determine if the Soviet leader was Jewish or not. Earlobes that were "attached" would indicate Jewish blood, while those that were "separate" would be Aryan. Hoffmann took the requisite image, and Hitler determined, to his own satisfaction, that Stalin was not Jewish.  Hitler would not allow Hoffmann to publish photographs of Stalin if he was smoking a cigarette, deeming it inappropriate for a leader of Stalin's status to be shown in that way.

Besides introducing him to Eva Braun, Hoffmann also introduced Hitler to art dealer Maria Almas Dietrich, who used that connection to sell hundreds of paintings to Hitler himself, for the collection of Hitler's planned Führermuseum in his hometown of Linz, Austria, as well as to other high-ranking Nazis, and to various German museums. In 1941, Hoffmann was chief among the many Nazi chieftains who took advantage of the occupation of the Netherlands to buy paintings and other artworks from Dutch dealers, sometimes at inflated prices. That drove the art market up, much to the consternation of Hans Posse, who had been commissioned by Hitler to assemble a collection for the planned museum. Posse appealed to Hitler to put a stop to it, but Hitler refused the request.

Hoffmann was also the person who recommended Dr. Theodor Morell to Hitler for treatment of his eczema.  Morell, who was a member of the Nazi Party, became Hitler's personal physician and treated him for numerous complaints with a panoply of drugs, including amphetamines, cocaine, oxycodone, barbiturates, morphine, strychnine and testosterone, which may have contributed to Hitler's degraded physical condition by the end of the war.

After about 1941, Hoffmann began to lose favor with Hitler, primarily because Martin Bormann – Hitler's personal secretary after Rudolf Hess flew to Scotland in a quixotic attempt to broker a peace deal – did not like him. Bormann increasingly controlled access to Hitler, and fed him misinformation and innuendo about any rivals for Hitler's attention, such as Hoffmann.

Family
Hoffmann married Therese "Lelly" Baumann, who was very fond of Hitler, in 1911. Their daughter Henriette ("Henny") was born on 3 February 1913 and followed by a son, Heinrich ("Heini") on 24 October 1916. Henriette married National Hitler Youth Leader Baldur von Schirach, who provided introductions to many of Hoffmann's picture books, in 1932. Therese Hoffmann died a sudden and unexpected death in 1928.

Hoffmann remarried shortly afterwards in 1929; his second wife was Erna Gröbke.

Publications
During the Third Reich Hoffmann assembled many photo-books on Hitler, such as The Hitler Nobody Knows (1933) – a book that Ron Rosenbaum calls "central to Hitler's extremely shrewd, extremely well-controlled effort to manipulate his image ... to turn his notoriously non-Nordic-looking foreignness, his much-remarked-upon strangeness, into assets to his charisma" – and Jugend um Hitler ("Youth Around Hitler") in 1934. In 1938 Hoffmann wrote three books, Hitler in Italy, Hitler befreit Sudetenland ("Hitler Liberates Sudetenland") and Hitler in seiner Heimat ("Hitler in his Homeland"). His Mit Hitler im Westen ("With Hitler in the West") was published in 1940. His final book of this period, Das Antlitz des Führers ("The Face of the Führer"), was written shortly before the outbreak of the Second World War. In 1936 he had effectively seized control of stereographer Otto Schönstein's publishing house, Raumbild-Verlag, which effectively put him in charge of all mass-market stereoscopic (3D) photography in Germany until the end of the Second World War.

After the war, Hoffmann published his memoirs in London in 1955 under the title Hitler Was My Friend.

Later life
Hoffmann figures prominently in the OSS Art Looting Investigation Unit's Reports 1945–46, Detailed Intelligence Report DIR N°1 carries his name. He was arrested by the United States Army on 10 May 1945, and he was later tried and sentenced to four years for war profiteering. The army considered him a "major offender" and Werner Friedman called him one of the "greediest parasites of the Hitler plague."

Upon his release from prison on 31 May 1950, he settled in the small village of Epfach in southern Bavaria, where he died seven years later at the age of 72. His widow, Erna, continued to live there together with the former silent-movie star Wera Engels.

Photographic archive
The central image archive of Heinrich Hoffmann's company was seized by the US-American military government after the end of the war during the Allied occupation of Germany as spoils of war. Important parts of the archive are today located in the US National Archives and Records Administration. They comprise an important source of images for scholars of Nazi Germany. These photographs are in the public domain in the US owing to their status as seized Nazi property, otherwise their copyrights would not yet have expired.

The part of the photo archive remaining in Europe is today located in the Bavarian State Library (Bayerische Staatsbibliothek) in Munich, Germany.

Secret photos of Hitler
Nine photographs taken by Hoffmann reveal how Adolf Hitler rehearsed poses and hand gestures for his public speeches. He asked Hoffmann to take these shots so he could see what he would look like to his audience, then used them to help shape his performances, which he was constantly refining. Hitler asked that the photographs be destroyed, a request which Hoffmann did not honor.

Postwar claims for Nazi-looted art 
Many artworks looted from persecuted Jewish collectors passed through Hoffmann. Restitution claims were met with resistance. In 2020, following years of negotiations, Jan van der Heyden's painting View of a Dutch Square was restituted to the heirs of Gottlieb and Mathilde Kraus, who fled Vienna in March 1938. Hoffmann had received it as a gift under the Nazis. After the war Bavaria made no attempt to return the work to the Kraus family, instead selling it for little money in 1962 to Hoffmann's daughter, Henriette Hoffmann-von Schirach.

References
Informational notes

Citations

Bibliography
Bullock, Alan (1992) Hitler and Stalin: Parallel Lives.  New York: Knopf. 
Bullock, Alan (1962) Hitler: A Study in Tyranny London: Penguin. 
 
Fest, Joachim C. (1970) [1963]. The Face of the Third Reich. Bullock, Michael (trans.) New York: Penguin. .
Fest, Joachim C. (1975) [1973]. Hitler. Winston, Richard and Winston, Clara (trans.) New York: Vantage Press.

External links

 
 Fotoarchiv Heinrich Hoffmann in the Bavarian State Library (database with 70.000 indexed and digitized images)

1885 births
1957 deaths
People from Fürth
People from the Kingdom of Bavaria
Photographers from Bavaria
Nazi propagandists
Adolf Hitler
Members of the Reichstag of Nazi Germany
Nazi Party politicians
German Army personnel of World War I